was a town located in Haibara District, Shizuoka Prefecture, Japan.

As of April 1, 2005, the town had an estimated population of 25,656 and a population density of 441 persons per km². The total area was 58.14 km².

On October 11, 2005, Sagara, along with the town of Haibara (also from Haibara District), was merged to create the city of Makinohara, and thus no longer exists as an independent municipality.

During the Edo period, Sagara was the center of Sagara Domain. It was incorporated as a town in 1889.

Dissolved municipalities of Shizuoka Prefecture
Makinohara, Shizuoka